Two total lunar eclipses occurred in 1978: 

 24 March 1978 lunar eclipse
 16 September 1978 lunar eclipse

See also 
 List of 20th-century lunar eclipses
 Lists of lunar eclipses